Nancy Laird Chance (born 19 March 1931) is an American pianist and composer. She studied at Bryn Mawr College from 1949 to 1950 and Columbia University from 1959 to 1967 with Vladimir Ussachevsky, Otto Luening and Chou Wen-chung.

After completing her studies, Chance worked as a piano teacher, composer and arts administrator. She received the ASCAP/Nissim prize for orchestral composition in 1981 for Liturgy and in 1984 for Odysseus. She also received two awards from the NEA, and fellowships from the MacDowell Colony and Sundance Film for composition in 1988.

Works
Selected works include:
Liturgy, for orchestra, 1979
Odysseus, suite for orchestra, 1983
Planasthai, for orchestra, 1991
Darksong, for chamber ensemble, 1972
Edensong, for chamber ensemble, 1973
Daysongs, for chamber ensemble, 1974
Ritual Sounds, for chamber ensemble, 1975
Ceremonial, for chamber ensemble, 1976
Declamation and Song, for chamber ensemble, 1977
Duos II, oboe, English horn, 1978
Duos III, violin, violincello, 1980
Exultation and Lament, sax, timpany, 1980
Solemnities, 1981
Woodwind Quintet, 1983
Rhapsodia, 1984
String Quartet, no.1, 1984–5
Elegy, string orchestra, 1986
Heat and Silence, 1989
Domine, Dominus, motet, double chorus unaccompanied, 1964
Odysseus, chorus and orchestra, 1981–3
In Paradisium, 1986–7, chorus and chamber ensemble, 1987
Pie Jesu, Libera me, Hosanna and Benedictus, chorus and chamber ensemble, 1990
3 Rilke Songs, Soprano, flute, English horn, violincello, 1966
Duos I, Soprano, flute, 1975
Say the Good Words, violin, synth, 1989
Last Images, film, 1988

Her music has been recorded and issued on CD by Opus One.

References

External links
Interview with Nancy Laird Chance, August 25, 1990

1931 births
Living people
20th-century classical composers
American music educators
American women music educators
Piano pedagogues
American women classical composers
American classical composers
Bryn Mawr College alumni
Columbia University alumni
20th-century American women musicians
20th-century American composers
20th-century women composers
21st-century American women